Class 81 may refer to:
British Rail Class 81 – a class of 25 electric locomotives
DRG Class 81, a class of 10 German 0-8-0T steam locomotives
KTM Class 81, a class of Malaysian 3-car electric multiple units